Shenzhen International Holdings Limited is engaged in the investment, construction and operation of logistics infrastructure facilities, third party logistics services and logistics information services. It is held by Shenzhen Investment Holding Corporation, an investment holding institution owned by Shenzhen Government and Cheung Kong Holdings.

External links
Shenzhen International Holdings Limited

Companies listed on the Hong Kong Stock Exchange
Government-owned companies of China
Logistics companies of China
Companies based in Shenzhen
Transport companies established in 2000
Chinese companies established in 2000